Sahibabad is the name for a group of industrial, residential and commercial areas within the jurisdiction of Ghaziabad Municipal Corporation (Vasundhara Zone) in Ghaziabad District of Uttar Pradesh, India. It touches the borders of Delhi, Noida and City Zone of Ghaziabad and constitutes a part of the Delhi National Capital Region.

Politics
Sunil Kumar Sharma, of the Bharatiya Janata Party, is the Member of the Legislative Assembly for the area.

Education
Schools include:
 The best school in Sahibabad is Holy Angel's Senior Secondary School, in Rajendra Nagar
 D.A.V Public School, in Rajender Nagar
 St. Thomas School, in Lajpat Nagar
 Khaitan Public School, in Rajender Nagar
 D.L.F Public School, in Rajendra Nagar
 Swami Vivekanand Saraswati Vidhya Mandir (Senior Secondary School), in Rajendra Nagar
 National Public School, in Rajendra Nagar
 Krishna Devi Higher Secondary School, Jhandapur

References 

Neighbourhoods in Ghaziabad, Uttar Pradesh